The St. Louis Southwestern Railway Company , known by its nickname of "The Cotton Belt Route" or simply "Cotton Belt", is a former Class I railroad that operated between St. Louis, Missouri, and various points in the U.S. states of Arkansas, Tennessee, Louisiana, and Texas from 1891 to 1980, when the system added the Rock Island's Golden State Route and operations in Kansas, Oklahoma, and New Mexico. The Cotton Belt operated as a Southern Pacific subsidiary from 1932 until 1992, when its operation was assumed by Southern Pacific Transportation Company.

Corporate history

The Cotton Belt was part of the railroad empire acquired by financier Jay Gould in the last quarter of the 19th century. "By 1890 Gould owned the Missouri Pacific, the Texas and Pacific, the St. Louis Southwestern, and the International-Great Northern, one-half of the mileage in the Southwest", the Handbook of Texas wrote.

The railroad was organized on January 15, 1891, although it had its origins in a series of short lines founded in Tyler, Texas, in 1870 that connected northeastern Texas to Arkansas and southeastern Missouri. Construction of the original Tyler Tap Railroad began in the summer of 1875.

On October 18, 1903, the Cotton Belt gained trackage rights over the Missouri Pacific Railroad along the eastern shore of the Mississippi River to reach East St. Louis, Illinois, and then used Terminal Railroad Association trackage rights into St. Louis.  The Cotton Belt operated a freight station in downtown St. Louis, but its main base of operations in the area was its yard and a locomotive servicing facility in East St. Louis, just east of Valley Junction, and south of Alton and Southern Railroad's Gateway Yard, and north of Kansas City Southern's East St. Louis Yard. Union Pacific Railroad now operates Cotton Belt Yard, although the engine servicing facilities have been demolished. 

The Cotton Belt and its subsidiary St. Louis Southwestern Railway of Texas operated 1,607 miles of road in 1945; 1,555 miles in 1965; and 2,115 miles in 1981 after taking over the Rock Island's Golden State Route. In 1925, SSW and SSW of Texas reported a total of 1,474 million net ton-miles of revenue freight and 75 million passenger-miles; in 1970 it carried 8,650 million ton-miles and no passengers.

The Southern Pacific Railroad (SP) assumed control of the SSW on April 14, 1932 and operated it as a subsidiary of SP until 1992, when the Southern Pacific consolidated the Cotton Belt's operations into the parent company. Southern Pacific merged with Union Pacific Railroad in 1996.

Passenger service

The Cotton Belt ran passenger trains from St. Louis to Texas and from Memphis to Dallas and Shreveport, Louisiana. Cotton Belt's Lone Star operated from Memphis Union Station to Dallas Union Terminal with a connecting section from Lewisville, Arkansas, to Shreveport. The Morning Star was the second named train over much of this route, operating out of St. Louis Union Station to Dallas, with a separate Memphis section inaugurated in 1941 to provide a convenient connection with the Southern Railway's Tennessean to and from Washington, D.C., and New York City. The Cotton Belt also operated passenger trains between Mt. Pleasant, Tyler and Waco, and a doodlebug between Tyler and Lufkin.

The Cotton Belt began a series of passenger train cutbacks in the early 1950s. The railroad had 25 steam engines and four gas-electric motor cars available for passenger service in 1949. By late 1952 nine diesels had replaced the steam locomotives and motorcars and passenger train mileage had been trimmed considerably. The final operations in Texas involved overnight service between St. Louis and Dallas, with major intermediate stops in Jonesboro, Pine Bluff, Texarkana and Tyler. The Cotton Belt was one of the first Class 1 lines in the southwest to discontinue passenger service. The last Cotton Belt passenger train, #8, operated on November 30, 1959, from Pine Bluff, Arkansas, to East St. Louis, Illinois.

Notable employees
Louisiana politician Andrew R. Johnson (1856–1933) was once a depot agent for the Cotton Belt railroad.

Railroad official Robert Krebs worked for Cotton Belt in the late 1960s and early 1970s as a trainmaster and terminal superintendent. Krebs became superintendent of the Cotton Belt at age 29.

See also

Cotton Belt Depot Train Museum
St. Louis Southwestern Railway of Texas

References

External links

Cotton Belt Depot Museum (Tyler, Texas)
Facts on the Cotton Belt 4-8-4's, Including the 819
 Cotton Belt website
 Cotton Belt Rail Historical Society
Cotton Belt Railroad Symposium, annual event hosted by Texas A&M University-Commerce

Bibliography
 Moody's Steam Railroads, 1949.
 Moody's Transportation Manual, 1968.
 Goen, Steve Allen. Cotton Belt Color Pictorial, Four Ways West Publications, 1999,  .
 Eighty Years of Transportation Progress: A History of the St. Louis Southwestern Railway (Cotton Belt Public Relations Department, 1957) as published in the October 1957 issue of The Cotton Belt News.

 
Predecessors of the Southern Pacific Transportation Company
Defunct Arkansas railroads
Defunct Missouri railroads
Defunct Texas railroads
Defunct Illinois railroads
Former Class I railroads in the United States
Companies based in St. Louis
Railway companies established in 1891
Railway companies disestablished in 1997
Defunct Tennessee railroads
Defunct New Mexico railroads
Defunct Louisiana railroads
Defunct Kansas railroads
Defunct Oklahoma railroads
1891 establishments in the United States
1997 disestablishments in the United States